1983 in the Philippines details events of note that happened in the Philippines in that year.

Incumbents

 President: Ferdinand Marcos  (KBL)
 Prime Minister: Cesar Virata  (KBL)
House Speaker: Nicanor Yñiguez
 Chief Justice:
 Querube C. Makalintal (until June 30)
 Enrique Fernando (starting June 30)

Events

February
 February 6—Fifteen workers die in a mine explosion in Danao, Cebu caused by a cigarette.

July
 July 12–15 Typhoon Bebeng, The monsoon spawns a tropical depression on July 12, east of the Philippines. It heads westward, strengthening to a tropical storm that night and a typhoon on the 13th. Vera makes landfall on the 14th as an 85 mph (137 km/h) typhoon in the Philippines, weakens over the islands, especially Luzon, and strengthens over the South China Sea to a 100 mph (160 km/h) typhoon. Damages amounting to a total of US$9 million in the Philippines. The typhoon leaves 45 people dead.

August
 August 17—An earthquake measuring 6.5 on the Richter scale strikes Luzon, the Philippines' largest island, leaving at least 21 people dead.
 August 21 – Former Senator Benigno Aquino Jr. and his assistant Ronaldo Galman are shot dead at Manila International Airport tarmac after his arrival. The event is cited to be a catalyst to the People Power Revolution.

September
 September 29 — Thirty-nine soldiers and 7 civilians are killed when an army patrol unit is ambushed by leftist guerrillas in Godod, Zamboanga del Norte; the death toll is the highest suffered by Government forces in a single attack.

November
 November 21 — A Philippine inter-island ferry sinks during a storm off Cebu, killing at least 13 people.

Holidays

As per Act No. 2711 section 29, issued on March 10, 1917, any legal holiday of fixed date falls on Sunday, the next succeeding day shall be observed as legal holiday. Sundays are also considered legal religious holidays. Bonifacio Day was added through Philippine Legislature Act No. 2946. It was signed by then-Governor General Francis Burton Harrison in 1921. On October 28, 1931, the Act No. 3827 was approved declaring the last Sunday of August as National Heroes Day. As per Republic Act No. 3022, April 9th was proclaimed as Bataan Day. Independence Day was changed from July 4 (Philippine Republic Day) to June 12 (Philippine Independence Day) on August 4, 1964.

 January 1 – New Year's Day
 February 22 – Legal Holiday
 March 31 – Maundy Thursday
 April 1 – Good Friday
 April 9 – Araw ng Kagitingan (Day of Valor)
 May 1 – Labor Day
 June 12 – Independence Day 
 July 4 – Philippine Republic Day
 August 13  – Legal Holiday
 August 28 – National Heroes Day
 September 21 – Thanksgiving Day
 November 30 – Bonifacio Day
 December 25 – Christmas Day
 December 30 – Rizal Day

Entertainment and culture

 February 13 - The launching of Ang Iglesia ni Cristo the first religious program on MBS Channel 4 (now PTV-4).

Date unknown
 The religious program Ang Dating Daan starts its television broadcast on IBC 13.

Births
 January 3:
 Precious Lara Quigaman, actress, Miss International 2005 winner
 Jopay Paguia, dancer and actress
 January 13 – Jojo Duncil, basketball player
 January 20 – Angelica Jones, actress, singer, and politician
 February 11 – Jeff Chan, basketball player
 March 2 – Jerald Napoles, actor and comedian
 March 11 – Bianca Gonzalez, host
 April 22 – Boyet Bautista, basketball player
 May 27 – Ronjay Buenafe, basketball player
 June 14 – Yousif Aljamal, basketball player
 June 24 – John Lloyd Cruz, actor
 June 28 – Maui Taylor, actress, model, singer
 July 10 – Doug Kramer, basketball player
 July 12 – Marco Alcaraz, actor, commercial model, and basketball player
 July 23 – Ping Medina, actor
 July 27 – AJ Dee, Filipino actor
 July 29 – Chad Alonzo, basketball player
 August 6 – Say Alonzo, actress, model, host
 August 10 – Mark Bautista, actor and singer
 September 6 – Aira Bermudez, dancer and actress
 September 9 – Kristine Hermosa, actress
 September 17 – Ice Seguerra, singer
 November 18 – JC Intal, basketball player
 November 22 – Eduard Folayang, mixed martial artist and former MMA World Champion

Deaths
 June 2 – Julio Rosales, Cardinal
 August 21 – Benigno Aquino Jr., politician and senator
 November 30 – Juan Liwag, lawyer and politician
 December 5 – Felixberto Olalia, labor leader; founding chairperson of Kilusang Mayo Uno (b. 1903)

References